The 1910 University of Utah football team was an American football team that represented the University of Utah as a member of the Rocky Mountain Conference (RMC) during the 1910 college football season. In its first season under head coach Fred Bennion, the team compiled an overall record of 4–2 record with a mark of 2–2 against conference opponents, tied for third place in the RMC, and outscored all opponents by a total of 70 to 44. The team played its home games at Cummings Field in Salt Lake City. William "Tiney" Home was the team captain.

In January 1910, Bennion was hired as the university's new head coach and athletic director. He had played for the football team earlier in the decade and then served as basketball and baseball coach at Brigham Young University (BYU). In April 1910, the university's petition for admission into the RMC was granted.

Schedule

References

University of Utah
Utah Utes football seasons
University of Utah football